Foma Bohemia spol. s.r.o is a photographic company based in Hradec Králové, Czech Republic established in 1921, originally as Fotochema, being renamed in 1995 on privatisation. They are mostly known for their line of black and white films and papers but also produce movie film,  X-ray films for medicine and industry and personal dosimetry film along with processing chemicals. They formerly produced aerial and surveillance films.

History
In 1919, engineers Evžen Schier and J. Bárta founded a company in Prague-Nusle for the production of photographic plates, sold under the brand name Ibis. In 1921, the company moved to Hradec Králové and changed its name to Fotochema.

Initially, production in 1921 was focused on photographic plates and processing chemicals. In 1931, production of black and white papers started, and in 1933 the production of roll films. Since 1949, the product range has been extended by X-ray films for medical uses (MEDIX) and X-ray materials for non-destructive defectoscopy. In the 1950s new products included graphic films for the printing industry, black and white cinematographic positive films and 35mm (135 format) perforated films.

In 1958, the company introduced the production of high-quality Fomacolor coloured papers and in 1964 colour negative films and in 1971 the production of Fomachrom colour reversal (slide) film. Continuous research and development led to the improvement of existing products and their further expansion, such as reprographic materials, special film for aerial photography, etc. Industrial X-ray materials (INDUX) were added in 1988.

After 1990, the company focussed on black and white photographic materials (films, papers, chemicals) and X-ray films MEDIX and INDUX including processing photochemical baths.

In 1995 the state-owned company Fotochema was privatised establishing Foma Bohemia Ltd (S.R.O.). In 1997 Foma achieved ISO 9001 quality assurance.

Black and white films
 Fomapan 100 Classic ISO 100 General purpose panchromatic fine grain film of traditional style. Formats: 135 (triacetate base), 120, Sheet film (polyester base).
 Fomapan 200 Creative (Revised 2015 on) ISO 200 Modern general purpose panchromatic film using both hexagonal core and shell tabular 'T' grains. Formats: 135 (triacetate base), 120, Sheet film (polyester base).
 Fomapan 400 Action (In Production) ISO 400 General purpose traditional panchromatic film. Formats: 135 (triacetate base), 120, Sheet film (polyester base).
 Retropan 320 Soft Retro 1950s style traditional panchromatic film characterised by low contrast images with a wide range of half tones which makes it suitable for contact printing or “retro” style enlarging of negatives particularly for portraits, still life, architecture, experiments, landscapes. Formats: 135 (triacetate base), Sheet film (polyester base).
 Fomapan R100 (In Production) B&W reversal film, intended for B&W motion picture movie making (Cine film) and also converted for still camera use. Processing available through limited number of commercial processors or using Foma Direct Reversal Kit. Polyester base: 8mm, 16mm and 135.

Photographic paper

 Fomabrom - Fibre Based (FB) (Baryta) Graded papers in Normal (N) or Hard/contrast (C) grades. Neutral to medium warm tone. Numbered; 111 Gloss, 112 Matte, 115 Velvet.
 Fomabrom Variant III - Fibre Based (FB) (Baryta) Variable Contrast papers. Neutral to medium warm tone. Numbered; 111 Gloss, 112 Matte.
 Fomaspeed - Resin Coated (RC) Graded papers in Normal (N) and Hard/contrast (C) grades. Neutral to medium warm tone. Numbered; 311 Gloss, 312 Matte, 313 Velvet.
 Fomaspeed Variant III - Resin Coated (RC) Variable Contrast papers. Neutral to medium warm tone. Numbered; 311 Gloss, 312 Matte, 313 Velvet.
 Fomatone MG Classic - Fibre Based (FB) (Baryta) Variable Contrast, Warm tone papers. Numbered; 131 Gloss, 132 Matte, 133 Velvet,
 Fomatone MG Classic - Natural paper base, Variable Contrast, Warm tone papers. Numbered; 532-II Nature and 542-II Chamois 
 Retrobrom - Fibre Based (FB) (Baryta) Graded paper in Special (Sp) grade. Warm  green-brown  tone suitable for retro-style prints. Numbered; 151 Gloss, 152 Matte. Launched in 2019.

Black and white photographic chemicals
The company produce a range of photographic developers for film and paper development.

Film and paper developers

 Foma Universal Developer - Normal working developer for film or paper

Film developers
 Fomadon Excel - Alkaline developer in powder form similar to Kodak Xtol
 Fomadon LQN  - Normal fine grain developer - liquid concentrate
 Fomadon LQR  - Higher contrast PQ developer - liquid concentrate
 Fomadon P - Metol-hydroquinone D76d powder developer (D76d has a higher proportion of borax compared to D76 which increases the buffering capacity)
 Fomadon R09 - Liquid developer to Rodinal formula

Paper developers

 Fomatol LQN Developer - Liquid concentrate to prepare normal-working developer.
 Fomatol P - Normal working paper developer providing a neutral black image tone in powder form.
 Fomatol H - Normal working paper developer in powder form.
 Fomatol PW - Powder developer with a warm image tone, for FOMATONE photographic papers

Other chemicals

 Fomafix - Standard liquid concentrate fixer
 Fomafix P - Two component powder acid fixer
 Fomacitro - Stop bath 
 Fotonal - Wetting agent
 Fomatoner Indigo - indigo toner
 Fomatoner Sepia - sepia toner

See also
List of photographic films

References

External links

Czech brands
Photographic film makers
Manufacturing companies established in 1921
1921 establishments in Czechoslovakia
Photography companies of the Czech Republic
Hradec Králové
Manufacturing companies of Czechoslovakia